The Men's time trial at the 2012 UCI Track Cycling World Championships was held on April 5. 27 athletes participated in the contest.

Medalists

Results 
The race was held at 20:40.

References 

2012 UCI Track Cycling World Championships
UCI Track Cycling World Championships – Men's 1 km time trial